Daniel Woolard (born May 22, 1984 in Bedford, Texas) is a former American soccer player and attorney.

Early career
Woolard played college soccer at Midwestern State University earning First Team All-American honors during his senior season. Afterwards, he spent two seasons with the DFW Tornados in the USL Premier Development League.

Professional career

In 2007, Woolard was drafted in the fourth round, 47th overall, by the Chicago Fire in the 2007 MLS Supplemental Draft, and spent the next three seasons in Major League Soccer, appearing in 16 first team games including 8 starts and scoring one goal.

After his release from Fire in February 2010, and having been unable to secure a professional contract elsewhere, he returned to play for the DFW Tornados in the PDL in 2010.

Woolard signed with the USSF D2 Carolina RailHawks in September 2010, and he started his first league match with the RailHawks against Crystal Palace Baltimore on September 3]. While with the RailHawks he played for the full duration of every match.

On January 6, 2011, Woolard returned to the MLS after being signed by D.C. United. Woolard impressed with DC, and became a starter as the season went by.

Finding a home with the Black and Red again in 2012, Woolard started 20 games on DC’s backline. Woolard tallied his third MLS goal  and contributed two assists in 1,754 minutes on the pitch. Woolard upheld his reputation as a constant performer on the back before suffering a concussion in August which left him sidelined until he was cleared during the 2012 MLS Playoffs.  Woolard Concussion 2012

Woolard was cleared of his concussion symptoms during the 2012 Playoffs, and continued his stay as one of the most consistent players on the backline for DC United in 2013. Since joining the Black-and-Red on Jan. 6, 2011, Woolard has never played less than 20 games in each his first three seasons. In 2013, he played and started 27 games and dished out one assist while logging the fourth most minutes on the team (2,235).

He was released following the 2013 season and retired from professional soccer thereafter.

Personal life 
Upon retiring from professional soccer, Daniel Woolard enrolled in law school at Samford University's Cumberland School of Law, graduating with a Juris Doctor in May 2019 and obtaining the State Texas Bar attorney license in October 2019. Together with his wife, they run an operate their own business Savvy Wool. He currently resides in Texas.

Woolard is the son of Marvin and Jane Woolard. He is married to Emily Woolard, and they have a pet Vizsla. Woolard is an avid Bowhunter and bass fisherman.  Daniel is a member of the Church of Jesus Christ of Latter-day Saints (LDS Church). He attended Midwestern State University.

Honors

D.C. United
Lamar Hunt U.S. Open Cup (1): 2013

References

External links
 
 

1984 births
Living people
Latter Day Saints from Texas
American soccer players
Association football defenders
Businesspeople from Dallas
Chicago Fire FC draft picks
Chicago Fire FC players
D.C. United players
DFW Tornados players
Major League Soccer players
Midwestern State Mustangs men's soccer players
North Carolina FC players
People from Bedford, Texas
Soccer players from Texas
USL League Two players
USSF Division 2 Professional League players